Dorokhin is a Russian masculine surname, its feminine counterpart is Dorokhina. It may refer to
Igor Dorokhin (born 1962), Kazakhstani-German ice hockey player
Pavel Dorokhin (born 1984), Russian football player
Yevgeniy Dorokhin (born 1986), Russian sprint canoer 

Russian-language surnames